A twenty-three-part referendum was held in Palau on 4 November 2008 alongside the country's general elections. Voters were asked questions on requirements of citizenship to hold office, government provision of primary school and health care, the definition of marriage and term limits for Parliament. Only the proposal permitting naturalization for certain adoptees failed to obtain the requisite majority of the vote and majority in 3/4th of the states.

Results

No dual citizenship for President
A popular initiative proposed amending the constitution to prohibit dual citizens from being eligible to hold the office of President or Vice President. It would amend Article VIII, Section 3 of the Constitution to read:

Separate election of President and Vice President
A popular initiative proposed amending the constitution to permit the President and Vice President to be elected separately. It was meant to undo joint election, which was passed by referendum in 2004. It would amend Article VIII, Section 4 of the Constitution to read:

Definition of the inauguration of President and Vice President
A popular initiative proposed amending the constitution to specifically define the end date of a presidential and vice presidential term and the inauguration of a new one. It would add a new paragraph to Article VIII, Section 4 of the Constitution which read:

Right to trial by jury for serious crimes
A popular initiative proposed amending the constitution to require a trial by jury for serious crimes. It would add a new section to Article IV of the Constitution which would read:

No dual citizens as members of Parliament
A popular initiative proposed amending the constitution to prevent dual citizens from being elected to Parliament. It would amend Article IX, Section 6 of the Constitution to read as follows:

Limits on compensation for members of Parliament
A popular initiative proposed amending the constitution to limit the compensation paid to members of Parliament. It would amend Article IX, Section 8 of the Constitution to read as follows:

Beginning and end of a legislative term
A popular initiative proposed amending the constitution to define the beginning and end of a legislative term. It would amend Article IX, Section 11 of the Constitution to read as follows:

No term limit for members of Parliament
A popular initiative proposed amending the constitution to repeal the parliamentary term limits amendment passed in 2004. It read as follows:

Separation of Appellate Division of the Supreme Court
A popular initiative proposed amending the constitution to separate the Appellate Division of the Supreme Court from the Trial Division. It would amend Article X Section 2 to read as follows:

Constitutional voting anytime
A popular initiative proposed amending the constitution to permit amendment of the constitution by referendum at any time, where referendums had previously been limited to taking place during general elections. It would amend Article XIV, Section 2 to read as follows:

Academic freedom at all levels
A popular initiative proposed amending the constitution to ensure a right to academic freedom in all institutions of higher learning. It would add a new section to Article IV to read as follows:

Dual citizenship with all possible states
A popular initiative proposed amending the constitution to ensure a right to academic freedom in all institutions of higher learning. It would amend the constitutional section on "Allowing Palauans Multiple Citizenship" to read as follows::

Naturalization for adoptees
A popular initiative proposed amending the constitution to permit adoptees to petition the government for naturalization. It would amend Article III, Section 4 to read as follows: 

This was the only proposal among the package of twenty-three which failed.

Postal voting for citizens overseas
A popular initiative proposed amending the constitution to permit overseas Palauans to vote by absentee ballot. It would amend Article VII to read as follows:

Land acquisition for diplomatic purposes
A popular initiative proposed amending the constitution to permit foreign countries to acquire land for diplomatic purposes. It would amend Article XIII, Section 8 to read as follows:

Land acquisition for non-Palauans limited to 99 years
A popular initiative proposed amending the constitution to limit land ownership by non-Palauans to 99 years. It would amend Article XIII, Section 8 to read as follows:

Support for Palauan culture
A popular initiative proposed amending the constitution to require the government to support Palauan traditional culture. It would amend Article V, adding a new paragraph which read as follows:

Marriage as between a man and a woman only
Voters were asked whether they approved of a popular initiative to amend the constitution defining marriage as between a man and a woman. Article IV, Section 13 of the Constitution would be amended to read as follows:

Free primary school
A popular initiative proposed amending the constitution to require the government to provide free education for grades one through twelve. It would amend Article VI to read as follows:

Free preventive health care
A popular initiative proposed amending the constitution to require the government to provide free health care. It would add a new section to Article IV to read as follows:

Priority of Palauan before the English language in the Constitution
Voters were asked whether they approved of a popular initiative to amend the constitution to give the Palauan version priority of interpretation over the English version. Article XIII, Section 2 of the Constitution would be amended to read as follows:

Definition of territorial waters
A popular initiative proposed amending the constitution to define the nation's territorial waters. It would amend Article I, Sections 1 and 2 to read as follows:

Judicial Appointments Commission only Palauan citizens
A popular initiative proposed amending the constitution to require all members of the Judicial Nominating Commission to be citizens of Palau. It would amend Article 7 Chapter X to read as follows:

References

2008 referendums
2008 in Palau
Referendums in Palau
LGBT in Palau